Sintgaing is a town and capital of Sintgaing Township in the Mandalay Region of central Myanmar.

Populated places in Mandalay Region
Township capitals of Myanmar